Zymoseptoria passerinii is a species of fungus belonging to the family Mycosphaerellaceae.

Synonym:
 Septoria passerinii Sacc.

References

Mycosphaerellaceae